Caran d'Ache is a Swiss manufacturing company of art materials and writing instruments. The company, established in 1915, produces a wide range of products including colored pencils, graphite pencils, pastels, fountain pens, ballpoint pens, mechanical pencils, markers, gouache paints, and ink cartridges.

History 
The company was established as "Fabrique Genevoise de Crayons Ecridor" in Geneva in 1915. When Arnold Schweitzer took over the company in 1924, he renamed it after Caran d'Ache, the nickname of the French satiric political cartoonist Emmanuel Poiré (who in turn took his name from карандаш (karandash), the Russian word for pencil, itself of Turkic origin).

In 1974, the company moved its production center to Thonex, a municipality of the Canton of Geneva. The company is known to include precious diamonds in the pens, and for that, in 1999, the Modernista Diamonds pen was included in the Guinness Book of Records as "the most expensive pen in the world". In June 2012, the owner Jacques Hübscher handed over the management to his daughter Carole Hübscher.

Products 
Some of Caran d'Ache products developed over the years include:

 Technograph, the classic pencil introduced in the 1920s. It has been its most longstanding product to date
 Fixpencil, a mechanical pencil invented by Carl Schmid in 1929.
 Prismalo, the first watercolor pencil in the world, launched in 1931.
 Neocolor (1952), a wax oil pencil, changed in 1972 to make it water-soluble
 Ecridor (1953), originally intended to a be an alternative to the Fixpencil, then added a ballpoint pen to its line to redefine it as a luxury product
 849 ballpoint pen of 1969, successor of the Ecridor
 Madison, the first fountain pen made by the firm
 6901 Luminance (2010), a new range of colored pencils

Gallery

References

External links

 

Manufacturing companies based in Geneva
Fountain pen and ink manufacturers
Pencil brands
Gouache brands
Design companies established in 1915
Swiss companies established in 1924
Swiss brands
Manufacturing companies established in 1915
Swiss companies established in 1915